A Quiet Place is a 2018 film. A Quiet Place may also refer to:

 A Quiet Place (album), a 1987 album by Roseanna Vitro
 A Quiet Place (opera), a 1983 American opera with music by Leonard Bernstein and a libretto by Stephen Wadsworth
 A Quiet Place, a 1971 novel by the Japanese mystery writer Seichō Matsumoto

See also
"The Quiet Place", a 2004 song by Swedish heavy metal band In Flames
Quiet Places, a 1973 album by Buffy Sainte-Marie